Hammam-e-Qadimi (Urdu:) is a functional 18th century Turkish bath in Bhopal, India.

Contact number for Ladies 7974756658 and Gents 7974767320.

Erected in the early 1700s during the rule of the Gonds, Hammam-e-Qadimi was gifted to Hajjam Hammu Khalida when Dost Mohammad Khan became Nawab of the city. The Indo-Turkish bath is owned by a descendant of Hajjam Hammu Khalida, Mohammad Sajid, and has been kept in his family for five generations. The oil used for the massages offered in Hammam-e-Qadimi is a special recipe of Sajid's family.

Hammam-e-Qadimi was built in the style of the Çemberlitaş Hamamı of Istanbul and was constructed near a mosque so that individuals visiting the mosque may perform their ablutions before going there to pray. Sanchari Pal describes the interior of Hammam-e-Qadimi:

See also 

Tourism in Madhya Pradesh
Hammam (Red Fort)

References 

Mughal architecture
Tourist attractions in Bhopal
Public baths